Antonio Handal (born 23 September 1951) is a Chilean sports shooter. He competed in the mixed skeet event at the 1976 Summer Olympics.

References

1951 births
Living people
Chilean male sport shooters
Olympic shooters of Chile
Shooters at the 1976 Summer Olympics
Place of birth missing (living people)
20th-century Chilean people